The plainfin sole (Achirus declivis) is a sole of the genus Achirus native to the western Atlantic in the Caribbean Sea and along the coast of the Americas from Belize to Santa Catarina, Brazil. This demersal species inhabits soft bottoms near the shores or estuaries.

References

plainfin sole
Fish of Central America
Fish of Colombia
Fish of Venezuela
plainfin sole